Eustacio B. Orobia, Jr. was the second Administrator of the Intramuros Administration, an attached agency of the Department of Tourism mandated with the authority to restore and guide the development of Intramuros, Manila. He was Administrator from 1986 to 1989, and was succeeded by Jose Capistrano. He was also the Chairman of the National Commission for Culture and the Arts from 1992 to 1996, a Member of the Board of Directors of the Nayong Pilipino Foundation from 1986 to 1986, and Head of the Presidential Task Force under the then Ministry of Human Settlements in 1986, among others.

References

Living people
Department of Tourism (Philippines)
People from Intramuros
Year of birth missing (living people)